Black v Law Society of Alberta, [1989] 1 SCR 591 is a leading Supreme Court of Canada on the freedom of mobility and freedom of association under the Canadian Charter of Rights and Freedoms.

Background
A number of lawyers from an Ontario law firm attempted to establish an office in Alberta. All the members of the Alberta office were members of the Alberta bar as well as partners in the Toronto office.

In response to this the province of Alberta amended the Alberta Law Society Act to require that members of the bar be residents of Alberta and can only be partner in a single firm.

The lawyers challenged the amendments on the basis that it violated their right to freedom of association under section 2(d) of the Charter and freedom of mobility under section 6.

Reasons of the court
Justice LaForest, writing for the majority, struck down the provisions of the Law Society Act on the grounds that it violated the freedom of mobility.

External links
 

Canadian Charter of Rights and Freedoms case law
Supreme Court of Canada cases
1989 in Canadian case law
Alberta case law
Freedom of movement